Selo Yumatovskogo Selkhoztekhnikuma (Yomataw selxoztexnikumı) is a rural locality (a selo) in Yumatovsky Selsoviet, Ufimsky District, Bashkortostan, Russia. The population was 355 as of 2010. There are 7 streets.

Geography 
Selo is located 38 km southwest of Ufa (the district's administrative centre) by road. Sanatoriya Yumatovo imeni 15-letiya BASSR is the nearest rural locality.

References 

Rural localities in Ufimsky District